Podpeč pri Šentvidu ( or ) is a settlement just east of Šentvid pri Planini in the Municipality of Šentjur, eastern Slovenia. The settlement, and the entire municipality, are included in the Savinja Statistical Region, which is in the Slovenian portion of the historical Duchy of Styria.

Name
The name of the settlement was changed from Podpeč to Podpeč pri Šentvidu in 1953.

References

External links
Podpeč pri Šentvidu at Geopedia

Populated places in the Municipality of Šentjur